Star Pravah is an Indian Marathi language general entertainment pay television channel owned by The Walt Disney Company India. a wholly owned byThe Walt Disney Company.

History
Star Pravah is a Marathi GEC of Disney Star, was launched on 24 November 2008 after Star Jalsha on 8 September 2008 and copied the same logo just the colour was blue instead of red. The channel with a new logo and graphics (the logo and graphics used by Bengali GEC Star Jalsha from 17 June 2012 to 17 February 2019) rebranded on 3 February 2014 with the tagline "Swapnanna Pankh Nave स्वप्नांना पंख नवे" (translation: dreams have new wings).

The channel again rebranded itself with a new logo and graphics on 10 October 2016 with new tagline "Aata Thambaych Naay आता थांबायचं नाय" (translation: Do not stop now). On 2 December 2019 channel again rebranded itself with the new logo and tagline "Marathi Parampara Marathi Pravah मराठी परंपरा मराठी प्रवाह" (translation: Marathi Tradition, Marathi Culture). On 1 May 2016, the high-definition feed of the channel named Star Pravah HD was launched.

Award function

Current broadcast

Drama series
{| class="wikitable"
! Premiere date || Series || Production company || Adaptation of
|-
|31 January 2022
|Lagnachi Bedi
|Shashi Sumeet Productions
|Bengali TV series Kusum Dola
|-
|14 February 2022
|Muramba
|Panorama Entertainment Pvt. Ltd.
|Hindi TV series Suhani Si Ek Ladki|-
|16 January 2023
|Shubhvivah|Tell-a-Tale Media
|Telugu TV series Chelleli Kapuram|-
|22 February 2021
|Swabhiman - Shodh Astitvacha| rowspan="2" |Frames Production
|Bengali TV series Mohor|-
|24 February 2020
|Sahkutumb Sahaparivar|Tamil TV series Pandian Stores|-
|23 December 2019
|Aai Kuthe Kay Karte!|Director's Kut Productions
|Bengali TV series Sreemoyee|-
|30 October 2019
|Rang Maza Vegla|Shashi Sumeet Productions
|Malayalam TV series Karuthamuthu|-
|5 December 2022
|Tharla Tar Mag!|Soham Productions
|Tamil TV series Roja|-
|2 May 2022
|Tuzech Mi Geet Gaat Aahe|Trrump Carrd Productions
|Bengali TV series Potol Kumar Gaanwala|-
|17 August 2020
|Sukh Mhanje Nakki Kay Asta!|Kothare Vision
|Bengali TV series Ke Apon Ke Por|-
|4 October 2021
|Thipkyanchi Rangoli|Film Farm India
|Bengali TV series Khorkuto|-
|23 November 2021
|Aboli|SOL Production Pvt. Ltd.
|
|-
|31 January 2022
|Pinkicha Vijay Aso!|Kothare Vision
|Hindi TV series Nimki Mukhiya|}

Reality shows
 
Former broadcast
Drama series
 Bandh Reshmache बंध रेशमाचे (2011-2012)
 Chhatriwali छत्रीवाली (2018-2019)
 Devyani देवयानी (2012-2016)
 Durva दुर्वा (2013-2016)
 Lek Mazi Ladaki लेक माझी लाडकी (2016-2018)
 Man Udhan Varyache मन उधाण वाऱ्याचे (2009-2011)
 Mulgi Zali Ho मुलगी झाली हो (2020-2023)  
 Nakalat Saare Ghadle नकळत सारे घडले (2017-2019)
 Phulala Sugandha Maticha फुलाला सुगंध मातीचा (2020-2022)
 Premacha Game Same To Same प्रेमाचा गेम सेम टू सेम (2020)
 Pudhcha Paaul पुढचं पाऊल (2011-2017)
 Sang Tu Aahes Ka? सांग तू आहेस का? (2020-2021)
 Swapnanchya Palikadle स्वप्नांच्या पलिकडले (2010–2014)
 Tumcha Aamcha Same Asta तुमचं आमचं सेम असतं (2015-2016)
 Aamhi Doghe Raja Rani आम्ही दोघे राजा राणी (2016-2017)
 Aaradhana आराधना (2012-2013)
 Agnihotra अग्निहोत्र (2008-2009)
 Agnihotra 2 अग्निहोत्र २ (2019-2020)
 Aambat Goad आंबट गोड (2012-2013)
 Antarpaat अंतरपाट (2010-2011)
 Are Vedya Mana अरे वेड्या मना (2015-2016)
 Be Dune Daha बे दुणे दहा (2014)
 Chaar Choughi चारचौघी (2009-2011)
 Chhoti Malkin छोटी मालकीण (2018-2019)
 Dar Ughada Na Gade दार उघडा ना गडे (2009)
 Don Ghadicha Daav दोन घडीचा डाव (2010-2011)
 Don Kinare Doghi Aapan दोन किनारे दोघी आपण (2011-2012)
 Duheri दुहेरी (2016-2018)
 Ga Sahajani गं सहाजणी (2016-2017)
 Goshta Eka Lagnachi गोष्ट एका लग्नाची (2008-2009)
 Goth गोठ (2016-2018)
 Jeevlaga जिवलगा (2019)
 Kukuchku कुकुचकू (2008)
 Kulswamini कुलस्वामिनी (2017-2018)
 Lagori - Maitri Returns लगोरी - मैत्री रिटर्न्स (2014-2015)
 Lakshmi vs Saraswati लक्ष्मी वर्सेस सरस्वती (2010)
 Lalit 205 ललित २०५ (2018-2019)
 Madhuri Middleclass माधुरी मिडलक्लास (2013)
 Mansicha Chitrakar Toh मानसीचा चित्रकार तो (2013-2014)
 Molkarin Bai - Mothi Tichi Savali मोलकरीण बाई - मोठी तिची सावली (2019-2020)
 Nakushi - Tarihi Havihavishi नकुशी - तरीही हवीहवीशी (2016-2017)
 Olakh ओळख (2009)
 Priti Pari Tujvari प्रीती परी तुजवरी (2015-2016)
 Runji रुंजी (2014–2016)
 Saath De Tu Mala साथ दे तू मला (2019)
 Sata Jalmachya Gathi साता जल्माच्या गाठी (2019-2020)
 Shatada Prem Karave शतदा प्रेम करावे (2018)
 Suvasini सुवासिनी (2009)
 Tu Jeevala Guntvave तू जिवाला गुंतवावे (2015)
 Tuza Ni Maza Ghar Shrimantacha तुझं नि माझं घर श्रीमंताचं (2009-2011)
 Tujvin Sakhya Re तुजवीण सख्या रे (2010-2011)
 Tujhya Ishqacha Naadkhula तुझ्या इश्काचा नादखुळा (2020-2022)
 Vaiju Number 1 वैजू नंबर १ (2020)
 Yek Number येक नंबर (2015-2016)
 Zhunj झुंज (2009-2010)

Crime series
 Lakshya लक्ष्य (2011-2016)
 Nave Lakshya नवे लक्ष्य (2021-2022)
 Jayostute जयोस्तुते (2014-2015)
 Prema Tujha Rang Kasa प्रेमा तुझा रंग कसा (2018)
 Prema Tujha Rang Kasa 2 प्रेमा तुझा रंग कसा २ (2018)
 Special 5 स्पेशल ५ (2018-2019)

Mythological shows
 Deva Shree Ganesha देवा श्री गणेशा (2020)
 Dakkhancha Raja Jotiba दख्खनचा राजा जोतिबा (2020-2021)
 Shree Gurudev Datta श्री गुरुदेव दत्त (2019-2020)
 Vithu Mauli विठू माऊली (2017-2020)

Historical shows
 Raja Shivchatrapati राजा शिवछत्रपती (2008-2009)
 Dr. Babasaheb Ambedkar - Mahamanvachi Gauravgatha डॉ. बाबासाहेब आंबेडकर - महामानवाची गौरवगाथा (2019-2020)
 Jay Bhawani Jay Shivaji जय भवानी जय शिवाजी (2021)

Dubbed series
 5 Star Kitchen ५ स्टार किचन (2020-2021)
 Devanche Dev Mahadev देवांचे देव महादेव (2020)
 Mahabharat महाभारत (2020)
 Ramayan रामायण (2020)
 Shree Ganesh श्री गणेश (2020)
 Satyamev Jayate सत्यमेव जयते (2012-2014)

Reality shows
 Aata Hou De Dhingana आता होऊ दे धिंगाणा (2022-2023)
 Bhanda Saukhya Bhare भांडा सौख्य भरे (2010-2011)
 Comedy Bimedy कॉमेडी बिमेडी (2020-2021)
 Dhabal Ek Taas Timepass ढाबळ एक तास टाइमपास (2014)
 Ek Tappa Out एक टप्पा आऊट (2019)
 Jodi Jamali Re जोडी जमली रे (2009)
 Just Dance जस्ट डान्स (2010)
 Kitchenchi Superstar किचनची सुपरस्टार (2017)
 Maharashtracha Dancing Superstar महाराष्ट्राचा डान्सिंग सुपरस्टार (2013)
 Maharastracha Nach Baliye महाराष्ट्राचा नच बलिये (2011)
 Mandal Bhari Aahe मंडळ भारी आहे (2015)
 Me Honar Superstar मी होणार सुपरस्टार (2020)
 Me Honar Superstar – Jallosh Dancecha मी होणार सुपरस्टार – जल्लोष डान्सचा (2021)
 Me Honar Superstar – Chhote Ustad मी होणार सुपरस्टार – छोटे उस्ताद (2021-2022)
 Me Honar Superstar – Aawaj Kunacha Maharashtracha मी होणार सुपरस्टार – आवाज कुणाचा महाराष्ट्राचा (2022)
 Nanda Saukhya Bhare नांदा सौख्य भरे (2013)
 Potoba Prasanna पोटोबा प्रसन्न (2018-2019)
 Sun Sasu Sun सून सासू सून (2021)
 Supriya Sachin Show - Jodi Tujhi Majhi सुप्रिया सचिन शो - जोडी तुझी माझी (2010)
 Vikta Ka Uttar?'' विकता का उत्तर? (2016-2017)

Sister channel

Pravah Picture is a Marathi language movie pay television channel owned by The Walt Disney Company India. a wholly owned by The Walt Disney Company. Along with its HD version, the channel has gone live from 15 May 2022 onwards.

Reception
Soon after its launch, it became one of the top three most watched Marathi GEC. The channel became the most watched Marathi GEC after 7 years with a steady rise in its viewership from October 2020 post COVID-19 pandemic break in India. In week 14 of 2021, it joined the ten most watched Indian pay platform television channels, occupying tenth position with 1341.11 AMAs.

Channel TRP

Ratings

References

External links

Television stations in Mumbai
Marathi-language television channels
Television channels and stations established in 2008
Disney Star
Mass media in Maharashtra
Mass media in Mumbai